Mental substance, according to the idea held by dualists and idealists, is a non-physical substance of which minds are composed. This substance is often referred to as consciousness.

This is opposed to the materialists, who hold that what we normally think of as mental substance is ultimately physical matter (i.e., brains).

Descartes, who was most famous for the assertion "I think therefore I am", has had a lot of influence on the mind–body problem. He describes his theory of mental substance (which he calls res cogitans distinguishing it from the res extensa) in the Second Meditation (II.8) and in Principia Philosophiae (2.002).

He used a more precise definition of the word "substance" than is currently popular: that a substance is something which can exist without the existence of any other substance. For many philosophers, this word or the phrase "mental substance" has a special meaning.

Gottfried Leibniz, belonging to the generation immediately after Descartes, held the position that the mental world was built up by monads, mental objects that are not part of the physical world (see Monadology).

See also
Dualism (philosophy of mind)
Monadology
Monism
Pluralism (philosophy of mind)
Johannes Jacobus Poortman

Concepts in metaphysics
Consciousness
Dualism (philosophy of mind)
Mental content